Graham Kerr was a Scotland international rugby union player. He played as a Forward.

Rugby Union career

Amateur career

He played for Old Dunelmians in Durham and Edinburgh Wanderers.

Provincial career

Kerr played for the Anglo-Scots in 1898.

International career

He was capped 8 times for Scotland from 1898 to 1900.

References

1872 births
1913 deaths
Scottish rugby union players
Scotland international rugby union players
Rugby union players from Aberdeen
Scottish Exiles (rugby union) players
Edinburgh Wanderers RFC players
Rugby union forwards